Uati Iutana (born 31 August 1969) is a Samoan former wrestler. He competed in the men's freestyle 74 kg at the 1988 Summer Olympics.

References

External links
 

1969 births
Living people
Samoan male sport wrestlers
Olympic wrestlers of Samoa
Wrestlers at the 1988 Summer Olympics
Place of birth missing (living people)
20th-century Samoan people
21st-century Samoan people